The 1955–56 Egyptian Premier League, was the 6th season of the Egyptian Premier League, the top Egyptian professional league for association football clubs, since its establishment in 1948. The season started on 23 September 1955 and concluded on 23 July 1956.
Defending champions Al Ahly won their 6th consecutive and 6th overall Egyptian Premier League title in the club history.

League table 

 (C)= Champions, (R)= Relegated, Pld = Matches played; W = Matches won; D = Matches drawn; L = Matches lost; F = Goals for; A = Goals against; ± = Goal difference; Pts = Points.

References

External links 
 All Egyptian Competitions Info
 season info

5
1955–56 in African association football leagues
1955–56 in Egyptian football